Acrolophus bactra is a moth of the family Acrolophidae. It is found in Panama.

References

Moths described in 1914
bactra